is a Japanese speed skater. He competed in the men's 5000 metres at the 2018 Winter Olympics.

References

External links

1996 births
Living people
Japanese male speed skaters
Olympic speed skaters of Japan
Speed skaters at the 2018 Winter Olympics
Speed skaters at the 2022 Winter Olympics
Place of birth missing (living people)
Asian Games medalists in speed skating
Speed skaters at the 2017 Asian Winter Games
Asian Games bronze medalists for Japan
Medalists at the 2017 Asian Winter Games
Speed skaters at the 2012 Winter Youth Olympics
Universiade gold medalists for Japan
Universiade silver medalists for Japan
Universiade medalists in speed skating
Competitors at the 2017 Winter Universiade
World Single Distances Speed Skating Championships medalists
21st-century Japanese people